I Used to Live Here Once: The Haunted Life of Jean Rhys is a 2022 book by Miranda Seymour that examines the life of Jean Rhys. The book has three "positive" reviews, ten "rave" reviews and one "pan" review, according to review aggregator Book Marks.

References

2022 non-fiction books
English-language books
W. W. Norton & Company books